Sara Marielle Gaup Beaska (born March 21, 1983) is a Sámi musician, singer, and yoiker originally from Kautokeino. She performs both traditional yoiks and modern yoiks.

Biography 
Iŋgor Ántte Ánte Mihkkala Sara was born on March 21, 1983 into a musical family. Her father is the famous yoiker Ánte Mikkel Gaup. Her sisters Risten Anine Kvernmo Gaup and Inger Biret Kvernmo Gaup are also yoikers. Another sister, Lena Susanne Kvernmo Gaup, has also yoiked on recordings with them.

Musical career 
In 2004, Gaup participated in the yoik category of the Sámi Grand Prix with a yoik called Lena Sunná. John Mathis Utsi won the category; Gaup did not place in the top three.  

The same year, she launched the band Adjágas with Láwra Somby. Both Gaup and Somby sang and yoicked in the band, which played on stages across the world, including as part of the lineup at Glastonbury in 2007. They disbanded in 2014.

At the same time that Adjágas ceased to exist, Gaup Beaska announced that she and Steinar Raknes had formed a new band called Arvvas.

In 2017, Gaup Beaska took part in the Norwegian TV series Muitte mu – Husk meg. On the show, she had to teach and coach the Swedish-Norwegian singer and winner of the 1985 Eurovision contest Elisabeth Andreassen to yoik.

Awards and recognition 
In 2002, Gaup was chosen to be Riddu Riđđu's Young Artist of the Year. In conjunction with the 2018 Sámi Grand Prix, she was awarded the Áillohaš Music Award.

Discography

Adjágas 
 2005 – Adjágas
 2009 – Mánu Rávdnji

Arvvas 
 2014 – Remembrance
 2022 – Dás dál

Compilation albums 
 2003 – Sámi Grand Prix 2003, with the song Meahcce sykkel together with Jakumbé
 2004 – Sámi Grand Prix 2004, with the song Lena Sunná
 2017 – Music Without Borders, with the songs Nordafjells / Liti Kjersti  and Guds Godhet

On other albums 
 2003 – Voices of Ice, 3 songs

References 

Norwegian Sámi musicians
Norwegian musicians
21st-century Norwegian women singers
21st-century Norwegian singers
Áillohaš Music Award winners
1983 births
Living people